Sanjiazi (三家子村) is a village in Fuyu County, Heilongjiang, China.

Sanjiazi may also refer to the following locations in China:

Sanjiazi Town (三家子镇)
Sanjiazi, Lishu County, Jilin
Sanjiazi, Xiuyan County, in Xiuyan Manchu Autonomous County, Liaoning
Sanjiazi, Hure Banner, Tongliao, Inner Mongolia

Sanjiazi Township (三家子乡)
Sanjiazi Township, Kaiyuan, Liaoning
Sanjiazi Township, Yongji County, Jilin
Sanjiazi Mongol Ethnic Township (三家子蒙古族乡), Lingyuan, Liaoning